The CICERO Center for International Climate Research (abbreviated CICERO) is an interdisciplinary research centre for climate research and environmental science/environmental studies in Oslo. CICERO was established by the Government of Norway in 1990. It is organised as an independent foundation and is affiliated with the University of Oslo. The current director is Kristin Halvorsen, former Minister of Finance.

Directors 
 Ted Hanisch (1990–1993)
 Helga Hernes (1993–1996)
 Knut H. Alfsen (1997–2002)
  (2002–2012)
 Cecilie Mauritzen (2012–2013)
 Kristin Halvorsen (2014–)

References

External links
Official site

University of Oslo
Climate change organizations
Environmental research institutes
Multidisciplinary research institutes
Scientific organisations based in Norway
Scientific organizations established in 1990
1990 establishments in Norway